Jacky Vincent is a British musician who was the lead guitarist and backing vocalist of the rock band Falling in Reverse from its formation until his departure in 2015 and was the guitarist of the power metal band Cry Venom. Since then, he has concentrated on his solo career and teaching. Vincent has two solo albums: Star X Speed Story, released in 2013 through Shrapnel Records that came third in the Guitar World 2013 readers poll for Best Shred album, and Life Imitating Art released in 2018.
Vincent won the Alternative Press Guitarist of the Year award in 2012 and came third (after John Petrucci and Joe Satriani) in the Guitar World "Best Shredder" readers pool awards in 2013.

Career

Early years
Jacky Vincent was born 23 January 1989 in Portsmouth, England. 
He is one of three siblings, having one older brother and an older sister. His father was a luthier who also played guitar, as well his brother. 
He began messing around with the guitar at the age of 5, played on and off for a few years, but did not start to actually practice until he was around 14–15. His first guitar was a 12 fret cheap nylon string that he inherited from his brother. His first electric guitar was a black Squier Stratocaster included in a guitar pack. 
He has said that the moment he began taking the guitar seriously was when his cousins introduced him to both Racer X and Michael Angelo Batio. Before this, he primarily focused on playing like Slash and Joe Satriani. During his teen years, he was able to teach himself all of the Best of the Beast by Iron Maiden. Being an all-time fan of Iron Maiden, it was a great honour when Cry Venom were asked to cover "Aces High" on track 10 on Kerrang magazines Maiden Heaven Volume 2 – An All-Star Tribute To Iron Maiden, released in June 2016, accompanying issue 1623 of the magazine. He attended a music school in England, but has never stated which one, but has credited it with helping him with practice schedules.

Falling in Reverse (2008–2015)

Vincent joined Falling in Reverse in 2008 as a founding member of the band. They released their debut album, The Drug in Me Is You, on 26 July 2011, which peaked at number 19 on the Billboard 200, selling 18,000 copies in its first week of sales. In December 2019 the album was certified Gold by the Recording Industry Association of America (RIAA) with 500,000 copies sold. Falling in Reverse's second studio album, Fashionably Late, was released on 18 June 2013, which peaked at number 17 on the Billboard 200. The band released their third studio album, Just Like You on 24 February 2015. On 30 October 2015, Vincent left the band on good terms to focus on his solo career.

Cry Venom (2016–present)
In 2016, Vincent formed a power metal band called Cry Venom with bassist Niko Gemini, keyboardist Colton Majors, lead vocalist Aleksey Smirnov and drummer Wyatt Cooper.

It is Vincent's first band since his departure from Falling in Reverse in 2015.

They released their debut album called Vanquish the Demon on 6 December 2016.

They embarked on a small club tour dubbed the "Vanquish the West Tour" in mid 2017.

The band was also the opening act for LoudPark in Japan, however, Wyatt Cooper was unable to attend. Because of this, former Falling in Reverse drummer Ryan Seaman reunited with Vincent for the show.

Personal life
Vincent moved to the United States at the age of 20 and lives in Las Vegas, Nevada.

In his spare time, besides playing guitar, he has stated that he practices the piano, has a passion for keyboard and plays a Korg Triton Extreme 88. He can be heard playing keyboard solos in songs 'Soul Shines Through' – (Life Imitating Art) and 'Grand Uppah' – (Life Imitating Art). His keyboard inspirations include YUHKI of the Japanese band GALNERYUS and Janne Wirman of the bands Warmen and Children of Bodom.

He trains in Muay Thai, enjoys playing video games and is an avid fan of RPGs, fantasy, and anime. His favorite games are Final Fantasy 7, Final Fantasy 8, and The Legend of Zelda Ocarina of Time. He enjoyed drawing in an anime style, but this was later replaced with guitar playing.

Gear

Guitars
Jacky Vincent has previously used Jackson guitars as his main instruments, and owns 1 Dinky and 2 Soloists. However, he is now endorsed by Dean Guitars. He now has two signature Dean Guitars, one of which is the main guitar he uses. It comes in purple, has 24 frets, has EMG pickups, and has a Floyd Rose Special bridge.
His other signature Dean guitar has the classic superstrat HSH configuration, has a bolt-on neck and comes in black finish with purple hardware and a maple neck.

Dean Guitars Endorsee
Vincent demonstrated Dean guitars on their stand at the 2013 and 2014 NAMM show in Anaheim California and was a guest at several Dean Guitar owners' clinics at Deans factory in Florida, working with Dean guitar owners to improve their techniques and to get the best out of their instruments. Dean were so impressed with Vincent's friendly style and technical ability that they approached him to ask if he'd be a Brand Ambassador. As a result, Vincent gave a series of guitar clinics at Dean stores around China in 2016.

Vincent also plays a Kiesel Vader guitar that has been fitted with his favourite Di Marzio Evolution pick-ups. Being headless means that there is less weight to support so he can concentrate on his left hand technique and a Dimarzio John Petrucci strap gets the instrument high enough to play at speed standing up.

For effects he uses a Fractal AX FX 2 XL loaded into a Gator flight case and Pro Tools in his studio.

Pickups
Vincent nowadays uses DiMarzio Evolution pickups in both neck and bridge positions.

Playing style
Vincent has an advanced knowledge of music theory, having a deep understanding of complex scale combinations and time signatures which assist him in his compositions.

He is known for his incredibly accurate picking, both live and in the studio. He is unique in the fact that he strictly economy picks his fast runs, rather than alternate picking them. He has stated the reason for doing so is to eliminate any extra hand and wrist movements, making his playing more efficient.

Vincent cited influences such as Paul Gilbert, Michael Angelo Batio, Vinnie Moore, Jason Becker, Shawn Lane, Allan Holdsworth, Brett Garsed, Frank Gambale, Guthrie Govan, Greg Howe, Joe Satriani, Steve Vai, Yngwie Malmsteen, Rusty Cooley, Andy Timmons, Scott Henderson, Derryl Gabel, and Rick Graham. Techniques most commonly associated with him include sweep picking, legato, tapping, and string skipping.

Vincent also stated that his biggest influences as a child were his father, brother, and bands like DragonForce, Sonata Arctica, Rhapsody of Fire, Galneryus, Heavenly, Dragonland, X Japan, and Angra. Vincent's brother and father taught him how to play the guitar, as explained in his Alternative Press Interview.

Tours
2011 Falling in Reverse first headline tour of 24 US venues. 
2012 Vans Warped Tour and The Thug in Me Is You Tour, Rock on the Range 2012. 
2012 Falling in Reverse opened for Guns and Roses at the sold-out show in the Hollywood Palladium.
2013 Vans Warped Tour, Monster Energy Aftershock Music Festival, Epicenter Festival, Intimate and interactive tour. Latin America tour Argentina, Brazil, Mexico.
2014 with Falling in Reverse and Escape the Fate "Bury the Hatchet" tour.
2014 Vans Warped Tour, Alternative Press Music Awards 2014. Rock am Ring festival with Iron Maiden and Avenged Sevenfold in Germany, Black Mass tour.
2015 Falling in Reverse European Tour 12 dates taking in France, Belgium, Germany, Poland, Austria, Switzerland, Italy and Holland, Three Ring Circus in the US, Rock on the Range, Sonic Boom, Northern Invasion.
2015 Westfest festival New Zealand, Soundwave Festivals Australia.
2015 Palermo Club, Buenos Aires, Argentina.
2017 Loud Park festival. Cry Venom played the heavy metal festival held annually at Saitama Super Arena in Saitama City, Japan.
Guitar Collective tour 2018 Vincent opened solo for Angel Vivaldi and Nita Strauss and then the show was closed with all three shredding together. A party trick was for Angel and Nita to blindfold Vincent while he continued to shred his solo.
Tony Mc Alpine Tour 2019. This was sadly cancelled by Tony due to Illness just before Vincent was due to join and open the 20 shows for Tony.
2019 Solo shows in Japan to promote Life Imitating Art album.

Teaching
Between tours, writing and product demonstrations, Vincent also teaches his unique style of speed playing on a one to one basis via Skype.
Since 2013, he has been a regular contributor to Guitar World magazine by sharing his playing styles and has produced detailed videos complete with backing tracks, fretboard mapping and tablature.
2018 – Sweep Tapping Mechanics
2019 – Lethal Legato,
Ultimate Speed Picking
Extreme Shred Techniques.
Advanced Tapping Phrases.

Discography

Solo
Star X Speed Story (2013)
The Sound and the Story Fret 12 (2012)
Life Imitating Art (2018)

Falling in Reverse
The Drug in Me Is You (2011)
Fashionably Late (2013)
Just Like You (2015)

Cry Venom
Vanquish the Demon (2016)

Collaborations
"Death From Above" by Oh, Sleeper (The Titan, 2013)
"You/Now (Venom)" by I Am WereWolf (Single, 2014)
"Breaking Damnation" by Jason Richardson (I, 2016)
"Gotta Catch 'Em All" by Tyler Carter (Single, 2016)
"Faceless" by KasterTroy (Single, 2018)
"Euphoria" by Syu (Vorvados, 2019)

Awards

References

External links 

 Official Website

Living people
English heavy metal guitarists
English rock guitarists
1989 births
Falling in Reverse members